Eugenio Pagnini (13 July 1905 – 29 September 1993) was an Italian modern pentathlete. He competed at the 1928 and 1932 Summer Olympics.

References

External links
 

1905 births
1993 deaths
Italian male modern pentathletes
Olympic modern pentathletes of Italy
Modern pentathletes at the 1928 Summer Olympics
Modern pentathletes at the 1932 Summer Olympics
People from Forlì
Sportspeople from the Province of Forlì-Cesena
20th-century Italian people